Graeme Revell (born 23 October 1955) is a New Zealand musician and composer. He came to prominence in the 1980s as the leader of the industrial/electronic group SPK. Since the 1990s he has worked primarily as a film score composer.

Some of Revell's best known film scores include The Crow (1994), Street Fighter (1994), Mighty Morphin Power Rangers: The Movie (1995), From Dusk Till Dawn (1996), The Craft (1996), The Saint (1997), The Negotiator (1998), Bride of Chucky (1998), Titan A.E. (2000), Lara Croft: Tomb Raider (2001), Daredevil (2003), Freddy vs. Jason (2003), and Sin City (2005). He is also known for his frequent collaborations with director David Twohy, having scored Below (2002) and the Riddick franchise. He is an eight-time recipient of the BMI Film Music Award, including the Richard Kirk Career Achievement Award, and an AACTA Award winner.

Biography

Early life
Revell attended Auckland Grammar School, where he finished his final year in 7A. As an orderly in an insane asylum in Australia in the late 70's, he and one of the patients formed one of industrial music's first bands, SPK, as an outgrowth of Mr. Revell's interest in music therapy. He spent the next decade making music that ranged from extreme to beautiful to academic and earning a reputation for wild stage stunts that included accidentally setting an audience member on fire with a flamethrower. Mr. Revell's break came in 1989, when he scored the Australian film Dead Calm. A Hollywood agent, Richard Kraft, heard it and tracked Mr. Revell down. Since then, Mr. Revell has been busy in Hollywood, working with everything from 85-piece orchestras for Mighty Morphin Power Rangers, to Tuvan singers and Armenian stringed instruments for The Crow, to brassy jazz and hip-hop rhythm loops in his current project, Fled, with Laurence Fishburne and Stephen Baldwin.

Education and training
Revell is a classically trained pianist and French horn player, but also graduated from the University of Auckland with degrees in economics and political science.

Vocational pursuits
He worked as a regional planner in both Australia and Indonesia, and was also an orderly in an Australian psychiatric hospital.

Musical career
Revell was a founding member of the industrial music band SPK, playing keyboards and percussion. The SPK single, "In Flagrante Delicto", was the basis for the Dead Calm film score (his first) that won him an Australian Film Industry award in 1989.

Most of Revell's subsequent projects were film scores. But in 1997, he teamed up with Roger Mason to create a non-film music album Vision II – Spirit of Rumi, released through New York based Angel Records. The two coproduced, supplied some of the instrumental accompaniment, and set to music 11 poems by renowned 13th century Persian poet Jalāl ad-Dīn Muhammad Rūmī. Vocals were provided by Noa, Lori Garson, Esther Dobong'Na Essiene a.k.a. Estha Divine, and the late Nusrat Fateh Ali Khan.

In 2002–03, he assisted the rock band Evanescence on their debut album, Fallen, in which he is credited for doing most of the string arrangements. He has also done string arrangements for Ludus, Stefy, Biffy Clyro and The Wombats.

Style
Revell's musical style is predominantly electronic and computer-based, yet often utilizes classical instruments or entire arrangements for certain pieces (similar to his contemporary counterparts, Hans Zimmer and Mark Isham). The orchestral scores that Revell has composed have changed throughout his career—from Bernard Herrmann-like pieces to Ennio Morricone-influenced works. "Whenever I write songs, I always have visual images in mind, and I have always changed styles dramatically. That's not good for a long-term rock career, but it's good if you want to score films." "I'm trying to bring a dose of class to Hollywood," he said. "I want my music to be the real thing instead of some terrible synthesized thing thrown together in a week. I don't want to sound just like everybody else."

Revell's music is often re-used from movie to movie and in more recent times he has collaborated with other artists on their albums. After the success of his soundtrack on Red Planet where he used the voice of French singer Emma Shapplin to back up and often lead his score, he collaborated with her on her own album Etterna, producing all of her songs.  He has recently been interviewed for the independent documentary Finding Kraftland.

Collaborators
Revell has been assisted in sound design by Brian Williams, who creates dark ambient music under the German language black humorous pseudonym Lustmord.

Awards and nominations
On 18 May 2005, Revell was honored at the annual BMI Film & TV Awards with the Richard Kirk Award for Outstanding Career Achievement.

Academy of Science Fiction, Fantasy & Horror Films, USA

ASCAP Film and Television Music Awards

International Film Music Critics Award (IFMCA)

World Soundtrack Awards

Venice Film Festival

Online Film & Television Association

Fangoria Chainsaw Awards

BMI Film & TV Awards

Works

Theatrical film

1980s

1990s

2000s

2010s

Television film

Television series

Video games

References

External links

1955 births
Angel Records artists
Industrial musicians
La-La Land Records artists
Living people
Male film score composers
Male television composers
New Zealand film score composers
New Zealand male musicians
New Zealand television composers
People educated at Auckland Grammar School
University of Auckland alumni
Varèse Sarabande Records artists
Video game composers